CNN Philippines Nightly News (titled as CNN Philippines Nightly News with Mitzi Borromeo) or simply Nightly News was the flagship late night newscast of CNN Philippines that aired every weeknights 9:00-9:30 pm and replayed Tuesdays-Saturdays at midnight. Undergone several incarnations, it began its airing on July 16, 2012, and was axed on February 12, 2016, to give way to the expansion of CNN Philippines Newsroom.

Background

TalkTV/Solar News Channel Era (2012-2014)

Formerly anchored by ABS-CBN news presenter Nancy Irlanda, the newscast was first known as Solar Nightly News and was launched on July 16, 2012, on Talk TV, by then aired on SBN UHF Channel 21. The launch of the newscast was a result of the formation as Solar Television Network's news and current affairs division, which in turn was brought by the privatization of Radio Philippines Network (RPN) by Solar Entertainment. It was carried over upon the channel's rebranding as Solar News Channel in October 30.

Solar Nightly News was simulcasted on RPN (by then affiliated by Solar Entertainment-operated ETC) from January 14 until November 29, 2013, after the network ceased production of its late-night newscast RPN NewsCap due to the retrenchment of the program's production team and other employees of the privatized network. The simulcast was also a replacement of Solar Network News to RPN's news content, as a result of Solar Entertainment's decision to scrap the cable-only limitation of American Idol season 12 and allow the broadcast to be available to RPN (over-the-air) viewers (in which the original plan was to limit the AI via satellite broadcast to cable viewers while RPN will continue to air Network News at 6 PM). On December 1, 2013, Solar News Channel switched its affiliation to RPN, making it a program at its own right.

Nancy Irlanda retired as the newscast's anchor on January 10, 2014; Mitzi Borromeo, anchor of Solar News program News Café took over by the end of the month. Hilary Isaac joined Borromeo weeks later but left some months later to join Daybreak.

9TV Era (2014-2015)
Solar Nightly News dropped the Solar branding on July 21, 2014, upon the impending acquisition of Solar Television Network (which turned into Nine Media Corporation) to the ALC Group of Companies a month later, with a new titlecard and graphic introduced on August 25, 2014, following channel's rebrand to 9TV. Mitzi Borromeo was held over as anchor. During the newscast's tenure, it also kept its one-hour runtime.

CNN Philippines Era (2015-2016)
The final incarnation was launched on March 16, 2015, in lieu with the launch of CNN Philippines along with a CNN-themed graphics and a revamped news studio. However, the newscast was cut to a half-hour to make way for the network's current affairs block. It also debuted segments such as Nightly Focus and Heads Up, a peek on the following day's headlines.

CNN Philippines Nightly News was axed on February 12, 2016, as a part of the network's program restructuring to be replaced by an Evening edition of Newsroom.

Final Anchors
Mitzi Borromeo (2014–2016)

Former anchors
 Nancy Irlanda (2012-2014)
 Hilary Issac (2014)

See also
 List of programs previously broadcast by Radio Philippines Network

References

Nightly News
Nightly News
2012 Philippine television series debuts
2016 Philippine television series endings
English-language television shows
Philippine television news shows